Ourville-en-Caux is a commune in the Seine-Maritime department in the Normandy region in northern France.

Geography

Heraldry

Population

Places of interest
 The church, dating from the nineteenth century.

See also
 Communes of the Seine-Maritime department

References

Communes of Seine-Maritime